The men's individual all-around competition was one of eight events for male competitors in artistic gymnastics at the 1996 Summer Olympics in Atlanta. The qualification and final rounds took place on July 20, 22 and 24th at the Georgia Dome. There were 111 competitors from 31 nations. Each nation could enter a team of 7 gymnasts (up from 6 in previous Games) or up to 3 individual gymnasts. The event was won by Li Xiaoshuang of China, the nation's first victory in the event and first medal of any color since 1984. Two nations making their debut as independent nations after the dissolution of the Soviet Union took silver (Alexei Nemov of Russia) and bronze (Vitaly Scherbo of Belarus). Scherbo had won the event as a member of the Unified Team in 1992; he was the 11th man to earn multiple all-around medals.

Background

This was the 22nd appearance of the men's individual all-around. The first individual all-around competition had been held in 1900, after the 1896 competitions featured only individual apparatus events. A men's individual all-around has been held every Games since 1900.

Seven of the top 10 gymnasts from the 1992 Games returned: gold medalist Vitaly Scherbo of the Unified Team (now representing Belarus), bronze medalist Valery Belenky of the Unified Team (now competing for Germany), fourth-place finisher Andreas Wecker of Germany, fifth-place finisher Li Xiaoshuang of China, eighth-place finisher Lee Joo-Hyung of South Korea, and ninth-place finishers Han Yun-su of South Korea and Szilveszter Csollány of Hungary. Li was the reigning (1995) World Champion; Scherbo had won in 1993, taken third in 1994, and finished second behind Li in 1995. Li recognized Alexei Nemov of Russia (relatively unknown in all-around but with strong results in each apparatus at the 1996 World Championships, which had no all-around event) as a bigger contender in Atlanta than Scherbo, however.

Armenia, Barbados, Belarus, Croatia, the Czech Republic, Georgia, Greece, Iceland, Ireland, Kazakhstan, Russia, and Ukraine each made their debut in the event. France made its 20th appearance, most among nations.

Competition format

The 1996 competition followed the revised format from 1992, which ended the carryover of preliminary scores to the final. The preliminary round and final round were separate. In the preliminary round (which also served as the team all-around competition as well as the qualifying round for the individual apparatus events), each gymnast performed a compulsory exercise and an optional exercise on each apparatus. (Many gymnasts from nations competing in the team event opted not to compete on each apparatus, as the team event required designating only 6 of the 7 as team competitors on each apparatus, reducing the incentive for specialists on one apparatus to compete on all others.) The scores for all 12 exercises were summed to give an individual all-around preliminary score. The top 36 gymnasts advanced to the individual all-around final—except that each nation was limited to 3 finalists. There, each of the finalists performed another exercise on each apparatus. The sum of these six exercise scores resulted in a final total. Each exercise was scored from 0 to 10; thus, the preliminary apparatus scores ranged from 0 to 20 each and the total preliminary score from 0 to 120. The final total, with six exercises, was from 0 to 60.

Schedule

All times are Eastern Daylight Time (UTC-4)

Results

All 111 gymnasts were ranked by their totals in the preliminary round, though only 74 completed all 12 exercises during the all-around during the compulsory and optional rounds on July 20 and 22. The 36 highest scoring gymnasts advanced to the final on July 24. Each country was limited to three competitors in the final.

References

External links
Official Olympic Report
www.gymnasticsresults.com

Men's Individual All-Around
Men's events at the 1996 Summer Olympics